Condylomitra tuberosa is a species of sea snail, a marine gastropod mollusk in the family Mitridae, the miters or miter snails.

Description
The shell size varies between 14 mm and 30 mm

Distribution
This species is distributed in the Indian Ocean along Mauritius and the Mascarene Basin and in the Pacific Ocean along the Philippines, the Fiji Islands and Papua New Guinea.

References

 Michel, C. (1988). Marine molluscs of Mauritius. Editions de l'Ocean Indien. Stanley, Rose Hill. Mauritius 
 Drivas, J. & M. Jay (1988). Coquillages de La Réunion et de l'île Maurice

External links
 Gastropods.com : Mitra (Nebularia) tuberosa; accessed : 26 January 2011
 W.O.Cernohorsky, The Mitridae of Fiji - The Veliger v. 8 (1965-1966)

Mitridae
Gastropods described in 1845